Rachid Bouchareb (born 1 September 1953) is a French film director and producer. His films are based on the complex history of France and its relationship with its former colony, Algeria. His films also examine racial discrimination and conflicts in other countries, using historical dramas and contemporary settings to show his message.

Career 
Born in Paris to Algerian parents, he began his career as an assistant director for television in France's state television production company, Société française de production (S. F. P), from 1977 to 1984. He subsequently worked for broadcasters TF1 and Antenne 2. During this time, he also directed some short films. In 1988, he began a career in film production working with his associate Jean Bréhat and Jean Bigot to create the production company 3B Productions.l He would go on to produce several films, including La Vie de Jésus (1997), Humanité (1999), and Flanders (2006), all of which were directed by directed by Bruno Dumont and were honored at the Cannes Film Festival.

Bouchareb has also directed many feature films. His feature film debut came in 1985 with Bâton Rouge. His other films have also been recognized at film festivals and won several accolades. In 1991, his film Cheb premiered at Cannes was the official selection from Algeria for the Academy Award for Best Foreign Language Film which was also produced by Bouchareb's 3B Productions. His other acclaimed films include Poussières de vie (Dust of Life) (which was nominated for the Academy Award for Best Foreign Language Film in 1995): 2001's Little Senegal and 2014's Two Men in Town, which both premiered at the Berlin International Film Festival. Bouchareb's biggest success is likely Days of Glory (2006), which was entered into the main competition for the Palme d'or at the Cannes Film Festival, with the ensemble of actors all receiving the award for Best Actor in 2006. Bouchareb described the filming experience as "fixing an injustice". The film has been cited as helping to release the pensions of several veterans from former French colonies after being frozen for years. Also in 2006, Bouchareb received the Henri Jeanson Prize from the Society of Dramatic Authors and Composers (SACD) for his body of work. In February 2009, his film London River premiered at the 2009 Berlin Film Festival, where the film's main actor Sotigui Kouyaté receiving the Silver Bear for Best Actor.

In addition to being a director and producer, Bouchareb is also a screenwriter, having written the screenplays for all his feature films. His screenplay for Days of Glory notably earned him the Caesar Award for Best Original Screenplay.

In 2007, Bouchareb was named a Knight of the Legion of Honour, the highest French order of merit. Apart from filmmaking, Bouchareb is a member of the board of directors of La Fémis, one of the world's best film schools.

In 2010, his film Outside the Law (Hors-la-loi) competed for the Palme d'or at the 2010 Cannes Film Festival in May. It was the official Algerian entry for the 83rd Academy Awards, and it was one of the five final nominees.

In 2012, he released the first part of his American trilogy, Just Like a Woman, starring Sienna Miller and Golshifteh Farahani. Two years later, the second part of his trilogy was released, Two Men in Town. The final part of Bouchareb's trilogy was released in 2018, entitled Belleville Cop. In 2016, he directed the television film Road to Istanbul, starring Astrid Whetnall. Most recently in 2020, Bouchareb gave a masterclass to 17 filmmakers from the Global South in the Institut Français' La Fabrique Cinéma, an event designed for first-time filmmakers.

Filmography

Feature films 

 1976: La Pièce (short film)
 1977: La Chute (short film)
 1978: Le Banc (short film)
 1983: Peut-être la mer (short film)
 1985: Bâton rouge
 1991: Cheb, a.k.a. Flucht aus Afrika
 1994: Poussières de vie, a.k.a. Dust of Life / Die Kinder von Saigon / Der Himmel ohne Sonne
 2000: Little Senegal (Prix du meilleur long métrage au 11e Festival du cinéma africain de Milan)
 2006: Days of Glory, a.k.a. Indigènes
 2009: London River
 2010: Outside the Law (French: Hors-la-loi)
 2012: Just like a Woman
 2014: Two Men in Town
 2016: Road to Istanbul
 2018: Belleville Cop
 2022: Our Ties

Short films 
 Le vilain petit poussin (2004)
 L'ami y'a bon (2005)
 Djebel (2007)

TV films 
 Des années déchirées (1993)
 L'honneur de ma famille (1997)

References

External links 

  La Beurgeoisie The French website for successful "Beurs".

1953 births
French film directors
Georges Delerue Award winners
French people of Algerian descent
Living people